McCrostie is a surname. Notable people with the surname include:

John McCrostie (born  1970), American politician
Lauren McCrostie (born 1996), English actress